Carex aestivalis, the summer sedge, is a species of Carex native to North America. The specific epithet, aestivalis, is derived from Latin and means "pertaining to the summer".

References 

Aestivalis
Taxa named by Asa Gray
Taxa named by Moses Ashley Curtis